Bronisław Dardziński (30 December 1901 – 13 May 1971) was a Polish actor. He appeared in seventeen films between 1938 and 1966.

Selected filmography
 Doctor Murek (1939)
 Lotna (1959)
 Pharaoh (1966)

References

External links

1901 births
1971 deaths
Polish male film actors
Male actors from Saint Petersburg